Trichonephila edulis is a species of large spider of the family Araneidae, formerly placed in the genus Nephila. It is referred to by the common name Australian golden orb weaver. It is found in Indonesia from Java eastwards, Papua New Guinea, Australia, northern New Zealand, and New Caledonia.

It has a large body size variability, females can reach a body length of up to 40 millimetres, males about 7 mm. The cephalothorax is black with a white pattern on the back, and a yellow underside; the abdomen is grey to brown.

The web is about 1 metre in diameter and protected on one or both sides by a strong "barrier" web. T. edulis breeds from February to May, and produces an average of 380 eggs.

According to the phylogeny tree of Nephilidae, T. edulis is closely related to its congener Trichonephila plumipes (tiger spider) which is also commonly found in Australia.

Name
The species was first collected and named by Jacques Labillardiere, in Relation du Voyage à la Recherche de la Pérouse (1799), becoming the second Australian spider to be described by a European naturalist. (The first was Gasteracantha fornicata.)

The species name edulis means "edible" in Latin. Labillardiere wrote: ”Les habitans de la Nouvelle-Calédonie appellent nougui cette espèce d'araignée, que je désigne sous le nom d' aranea edulis (araignée que les Calédoniens mangent).“ („The inhabitants of New Caledonia call this spider nougui. I have described it under the name Aranea edulis, meaning spiders that the New Caledonians eat.“)

As food 
Trichonephilia edulis is an edible spider. Several related spiders are considered a delicacy in New Guinea, "plucked by the legs from their webs and lightly roasted over an open fire".

References

Further reading
 Uhl, G. & Vollrath, F (2000). Extreme body size variability in the golden silk spider (Nephila edulis) does not extend to genitalia. J. Zool. Lond. 251:7-14 PDF

Gallery

External links
 Pictures and info
 The Food Insect Newsletter, July 1993

Araneidae
Edible spiders
Spiders of Australia
Spiders of Indonesia
Spiders of New Caledonia
Spiders of New Zealand
Fauna of Papua New Guinea
Spiders described in 1799
Taxa named by Jacques Labillardière
Taxobox binomials not recognized by IUCN